Oduduwa is believed to have entered Yoruba life about 900 years ago. According to early historians, Oduduwa was an exiled prince of a foreign people who left his homeland with a retinue and journeyed south, subsequently settling among the aboriginal Yoruba at some point in the 12th century.

Oduduwa is said to have brought the Yoruba religion with him when he came. This faith system was so important to him and his followers that it is said to have been the cause of their exodus in the first place.

Historical accounts say that the time and length of his reign are not certain but the Oduduwa is believed to be as old as time itself.

Oduduwa was not only the first ruler of a unified Ife, but also the progenitor of various independent royal dynasties in Yorubaland, and is today venerated as “the hero, the warrior, the leader, and father of the Yoruba race”.

Oduduwa had only one son whose name was ‘OKANBI’ alias ‘Idekoserake’. Okanbi, in turn, gave birth to seven children: the first of them being two princesses after which came five princes.

The location of Oduduwa’s land of origin is a matter of some debate. The popular opinions of a number of the Yoruba claim that he was a prince of Mecca. It was supposedly the persecution of the Muslim elite of the city that caused him and his fellow animists to leave Arabia.

However, there is another school of thought among some Yoruba historians claiming that Oduduwa came from the East. These Yoruba historians are more specific and claim that Oduduwa first settled on a hill East of the valley over-looking the native Yoruba settlements.

Either way, it is now considered a historical fact that Oduduwa and his fellow settlers were outsiders from elsewhere that were absorbed by the aborigines of Ife.

Through war lasting many years, Oduduwa was able to defeat the forces of the 13 indigenous communities of Ife led by Obatala (the powerful and sweetest god) and formed these communities into a single Ife state.

He held the praise names Olofin Adimula, Olofin Aye and Olufe. Since he is held by the Yoruba to have been the ancestor of their numerous crowned kings, his name, phonetically written by Yoruba language-speakers as Odùduwà and sometimes contracted as Ooduwa, Odudua or Oòdua, is generally ascribed to the ancestral dynasties of Yorubaland.

Following his posthumous deification, he was admitted to the Yoruba pantheon as an aspect of a primordial divinity of the same name, historical accounts state.

Etymology
The etymological derivation of the Yoruba name “Oduduwa” is: Odu-ti-o-da-uwa (i.e. Odu-ti-o-da-iwa).

This translates literally to: The great repository which brings forth existence.

Ife traditions 

Ife tradition, which modern Yoruba historians accord precedence, relates that Oduduwa was an emissary from the community of Oke-Ora, the easternmost part of the Ife cultural area which stretches towards the Northeastern Ijesa people. He is said to have been a warrior that wore armor made of iron.
At that time, a confederacy existed between the 13 communities of the valley of Ile-Ife, with each community or 'Elu' having its own Oba; the Oba of Ijugbe, the Oba of Ejio, the Oba of Iwinrin etc.

When Oduduwa rose to be a prominent citizen of Ife, he and his group are believed to have disrupted the political structure of the 13 communities through the support of about 6 of the 13 component communities. Rather than deposing Obatala, the town was divided into two with both figures serving as kings of their respective groups. His reign was largely restricted to Idio. However, Ife tradition states that he was never known as an Ooni and neither did he use the Ife traditional crown.

Later years
The leadership contest was brought to an end following the collaborative effort of Obatala, Orunmila and Owa Ilare. The 3 figures were able to facilitate the death of Oduduwa. Following this, a major part of Oduduwa's support base dispersed - this has been reinterpreted to mean a dispersal of his children and grandchildren from Ife to the outposts that they had previously founded or gained influence over.

Obalufon II Alayemore was on the throne when Oranmiyan, the son of Ogun but often associated with Oduduwa, returned from his sojourn and contested Obalufon’s kingship. It is unclear how Lajamisan is Oranmiyan's son,  though he brutally seized the throne and is arguably the progenitor of all of the Oonis that have reigned in Ife from his time till now, prompting historians to label it the Lajamisan dynasty, which has remained unbroken for almost 700 years.

Oranmiyan

Oranmiyan was a biological son of Ogun who was the son of Oduduwa and was his war captain, hence the misconception that Oranmiyan had two fathers. He was one of the most adventurous of the Yoruba historical figures. The controversy surrounding his birth is due to the fact that both Oduduwa and Ogun had affairs with the same woman, his mother Lakange. Ogun was a warrior whose expedition led to capturing Lakange as war booty and he had sexual relations with her. Oduduwa equally desired the woman and had sexual relations with her while she was pregnant. Whatever the case, the affair resulted in the birth of Odede, otherwise known as Oranmiyan. Oranmiyan would later become the first Alaafin of Oyo and an early Ooni of Ife. He also married a daughter of a Benin chief who gave birth to Eweka, the founder of the Oba dynasty in Benin.

Moremi and the Ugbo

After the dispersal of most members of the family of Oduduwa, the aborigines became ungovernable, and constituted themselves into a serious threat to the survival of Ife. Thought to be descendants of Oranfe through Obalufon Ogbogbodinrin (Osangangan Obamakin) who had ruled the land before the arrival of Oranmiyan, these people turned themselves into marauders. They would come to town in costumes made of raffia with terrible and fearsome appearances, and burn down houses and loot the markets. It is at this point that Moremi Ajasoro, a woman from Igun in Ile-Ife, came onto the scene. She was married to Lukugba, Obalufon Alayemore and Oranmiyan at different times; she subsequently played a significant role in restoring normalcy back to the situation through a spying mission. She allowed herself to be captured and taken away with the marauders. Subsequent to this, she married the king of the Ugbo. Her new husband wanted pleasures from her but she wouldn't give in because she was married previously and was on a mission. She told him to tell her the secret of the marauders, he didn't want to but after a great deal of prodding, he gave in. He told her that the only thing they fear was FIRE, if they saw fire they would run. After this information she concocted an escape plan. She asked for some oranges and made the juice have a sleeping effect on the palace people. When they woke up after eating them, they found that she had gone to tell her people of their weakness. Using this information, the people of Ife were soon prepared for the marauders.

Alternative views

Oduduwa and his/her role in creation 

Yoruba religious traditions about the dawn of time claim that Oduduwa was Olodumare's favourite Orisa. As such, he (or she, as the primordial Oduduwa originally represented the Divine Feminine aspect and Obatala the Divine Masculine) was sent from heaven to create the earth upon the waters, a mission he/she had usurped from his/her consort and sibling Obatala, who had been equipped with a snail shell filled with sand and a rooster to scatter the said sand in order to create land. These beliefs are held by Yoruba traditionalists to be the cornerstone of their story of creation. Obatala and Oduduwa here are represented symbolically by a calabash, with Obatala taking the top and Oduduwa taking the bottom. In this narrative, Oduduwa is also known as Olofin Otete, the one who took the Basket of Existence from Olodumare.

Another depiction of Oduduwa as being the wife of Obatala is presented in Odu Ifa Osa Meji, a verse of the Ifa oracle. In this Odu, Obatala discovers the secret of his wife and steals the masquerade's robes from her to wear it himself. This is suggested to be a historical representation of a switch from matriarchy to patriarchy.  

This cosmological tradition has sometimes been blended with the tradition of the historical Oduduwa. According to others, the historical Oduduwa is considered to be named after the earlier version of Oduduwa, who is female and related to the Earth called Ile.

The earlier traditions of either a gender fluid or an expressly female Oduduwa are seen in the spirit's representation in the Gelede tradition. Initiates of Gelede receive a shrine to Oduduwa along with a Gelede costume and mask. This speaks to Oduduwa as being associated wíth the divine ancestral mothers that are known as Awon iya wa or Iyami. Here, Oduduwa is revered as the mother of the Yoruba.

A Muslim Yoruba's view
Among the critics of Yoruba traditions about Oduduwa is the London-based Muslim Yoruba scholar, Sheikh Dr. Abu-Abdullah Adelabu. In an interview with a Nigerian media house, the founder and spiritual leader of Awqaf Africa Society in London dismissed the common belief that all Yorubas are descendants of Oduduwa as "a false representation by Orisha worshippers to gain an unjust advantage over the spread of Islam and the recruitment of Christianity".  The Muslim scholar advised his followers against using phrases such as Omo Oduduwa (or Children of Oduduwa) and Ile Oduduwa (or Land of Oduduwa). He argued that the story that all the Yorubas are children of Oduduwa was based only on word of mouth.

Other alternative views
Certain other peoples have claimed a connection to Oduduwa. According to the Kanuri, Yauri, Gobir, Acipu, Jukun and Borgu tribes - whose founding ancestors were said to be Oduduwa's brothers   (as recorded in the 19th century by Samuel Johnson), Oduduwa was the son of Damerudu, whom Yoruba call Lamurudu, a prince who was himself the son of the magician King Kisra. Kisra and his allies are said to have fought Mohammed in the Battle of Badr. Kisra was forced to migrate from Arabia into Africa after losing the war to the jihadists in  624 AD. He and his followers founded many kingdoms and  ruling dynasties along their migration route into West Africa. This tradition is a variant of the belief, popular amongst some Muslims, that held that Oduduwa was a prince originating from Mecca. However, it is thought by some scholars to derive from the later influences on Yoruba culture of Islamic and other Abrahamic religions, and conflicts with other traditions from the Yoruba traditional corpus.

See also
 Candomble religion
 List of rulers of Ife
 Legends of Africa
 Santeria religion
 Yoruba religion

References

Further reading
Ojuade, J. S., "The issue of 'Oduduwa' in Yoruba genesis: the myths and realities", Transafrican Journal of History, 21 (1992), 139–158.

Legendary progenitors
Oonis of Ife
Yoruba gods
Yoruba history
Yoruba culture
Yoruba mythology
Yoruba warriors
Yoruba kings